Francis "Frank" Lawry (1839 – 19 January 1921) was a conservative then Liberal Party Member of Parliament in New Zealand.

Biography

Early life
Lawry was born in Bleadon, Somerset, England, in 1839, the son of William Lawry, a farmer and Methodist minister. He was educated at the British school at Weston-super-Mare, and then entered a career in farming. Lawry emigrated to New Zealand in 1863 aboard the ship Ulcoates. At Epsom on 21 October 1868 he married Sarah Davies. The couple went on to have one daughter.

Lawry entered public life as a member of the North Auckland Cattle Boards and was later president of the Auckland Agricultural and Pastoral Association. He was the chairman of the Epsom Road Board for thirteen consecutive years and spent two years as a member of the Board of Education. He was also a Freemason.

Political career

In the 1881 general election he contested the  electorate. He was beaten by Ebenezer Hamlin, by the mere majority of 40 votes. He won the Franklin North electorate in 1887, and then the Parnell electorate in 1890 which he represented until he retired in 1911.

In the 1890 election, he was listed as a supporter of the conservative Atkinson Ministry, led by Harry Atkinson. Following the election, he did change his allegiance to the Liberal Party and became Senior Whip for the Liberal Government from 1891 until his resignation from the role on 29 October 1894.

Throughout his long Parliamentary career he was a member of many committees, chiefly the Agricultural and Pastoral Committee, which for several years he was its chairman.

Death
Lawry died in Auckland in 1921, and was buried at St Matthias' Church, Panmure.

Notes

References

1839 births
1921 deaths
People from North Somerset (district)
English emigrants to New Zealand
New Zealand Liberal Party MPs
Members of the New Zealand House of Representatives
Unsuccessful candidates in the 1884 New Zealand general election
New Zealand MPs for Auckland electorates
New Zealand Freemasons
19th-century New Zealand politicians